Dr. Shiva is the stage name of Ramier Siva-Nandan, an Indo-Canadian musician and actor based in Mississauga, Ontario.

Early life
Born and raised in India, Siva-Nandan moved to Canada in 1995.

Career
Dr. Shiva acted in the film Amal. He also composed music for the film, including the song "Rahi Nagufta", for which he won a Genie Award for Best Original Song in 2009.

He provided music and vocals for Stephen Lategan's short film Coxwell & Gerrard, which won a Special Jury Remy Award at Worldfest Houston.

References

External links

Dr. Shiva

 

Canadian male film actors
Canadian male television actors
Canadian film score composers
Indian male film score composers
Canadian male actors of Indian descent
Indian film score composers
Indian emigrants to Canada
Living people
Best Original Song Genie and Canadian Screen Award winners
Canadian world music musicians
Dr. Shiva
Canadian musicians of Indian descent
Year of birth missing (living people)